Nikolai Yeremenko may refer to:
 Nikolai Yeremenko Jr. (1949–2001), Soviet-Belarusian actor
 Nikolai Yeremenko Sr. (1926–2000), Soviet-Belarusian actor